Jhalokati is a town in Jhalokati district in the division of Barisal in southern Bangladesh. It is the administrative headquarter and the largest town of Jhalokati district.

References

External links

Jhalokati District